Hell Bent is the debut studio album by Potty Mouth. It was released on September 16, 2013.

Singles
"The Spins" was released June 7, 2013.

"Black and Studs" was released August 13, 2013.

"Damage" was released September 17, 2013.

Composition
Singer Abby Weems wrote the majority of the album's lyrics.

Reception

Allmusic gives Hell Bent 3.5 stars out of 5.

Track listing

Personnel
Potty Mouth
 Abby Weems – lead vocals, rhythm guitar
 Ally Einbinder – bass
 Phoebe Harris – lead guitar, co-lead vocals (uncredited) on "The Better End"
 Victoria Mandanas – drums

Additional personnel
 Will Killingsworth – mixing
 Carl Saff – mastering

References

External links
 Potty Mouth - Hell Bent

2013 albums
Pop punk albums by American artists
Punk rock albums by American artists
Riot grrrl albums